The Wire, a television drama series created by David Simon, premiered on June 2, 2002 on HBO in the United States and ended on March 9, 2008. 60 episodes aired over the show's five seasons, plus three additional prequel shorts. Each episode has a running time of 55–60 minutes.

The Wire is set in Baltimore, Maryland; each season of the series expands its focus on a different part of the city. The show features a large ensemble cast; many characters are only featured prominently in a single season. A group of characters, mainly in the Baltimore Police Department, appear in every season.

The show is available on DVD in Region 1, 2 and 4.

Series overview

Episodes

Season 1 (2002)

Season 2 (2003)

Season 3 (2004)

Season 4 (2006)

Season 5 (2008)

Prequel shorts
Three short film vignettes set prior to the series events were filmed during the fifth season's production. They were made available via HBO On Demand during broadcast of the final season, and included as extras on the complete series DVD box set.

"When Bunk Met McNulty"
"Young Omar"
"Young Prop Joe"

References

External links
 
 

Wire, The